Valeriu Catînsus (born 27 April 1978) is a former Moldovan football player.

International career

Catînsus has made 50 appearances for the Moldova national football team. He played 8 games in 2002 FIFA World Cup qualification (UEFA), 8 games in UEFA Euro 2004 qualifying, 10 games in 2006 FIFA World Cup qualification (UEFA) and 3 games in UEFA Euro 2008 qualifying. He played his last game against Latvia on 14 October 2009.

References

External links

 
 
 
 
 Player profile on RFPL.org

1978 births
Living people
Footballers from Chișinău
Moldovan footballers
Moldovan expatriate footballers
Moldova international footballers
Expatriate footballers in Russia
Expatriate footballers in Ukraine
Moldovan expatriate sportspeople in Ukraine
Association football defenders
FC Zimbru Chișinău players
Moldovan Super Liga players
FC Chornomorets Odesa players
FC Tom Tomsk players
FC Shinnik Yaroslavl players
Russian Premier League players
Ukrainian Premier League players
FC Arsenal Tula players